Rayavaram is a village Panchayat in Pudukkottai district in Tamil Nadu, India.

Geography
The nearest town is Pudukkottai. The closest airport is at Tiruchirappalli. It is well connected by road and has at least 75 buses covering surrounding areas.

The village's economy is based on agriculture.

Demographics

, Rayavaram had a population of 14,643. Males constituted 49% of the population and females 51%. Rayavaram had an average literacy rate of 75%, higher than the national average of 59.5%; with 54% of the males and 46% of females literate. 12% of the population was under 6 years of age.

Transport
Rayavaram had well connected with road.  Bus station had Provided to travel with Thirumayam, Pudukkottai, Karaikudi, Sivaganga, Aranthangi, Arimalam, Devakottai, Dindigal, Thiruchirapalli, Coimbatore,  
Madurai and Chennai.

The Nearest Railway stations is Thirumayam and Pudukkottai railway station. The Nearest Airport is Tiruchirappalli International Airport and Madurai International Airport.

Temple

 Rock Cut Shiva Temple Kottaiyur Rayavaram 
 Muthumari Amman Temple
 Iththimaraththu Vinayakar Temple
 Shivan Temple
 Perumal Temple
 Malaikuluthu Rock Cut Shiva Temple 
 Anjinear Temple 
 Ayyanar Temple
 Lingaththu Urani Shivan Temple
 Maha Ganapathi Temple (Kayilai) 
 Senkeerai Munnodi Karuppar Temple 
 Senkeerai Ayyanaar Temple 
 Senkeerai Chelli Amman Temple 
 Senkeerai Pattan Kovil
 Senkeerai Adaikkalam Kattar Kovil 
 Senkeerai Ulagikalli Kovil
 Senkeerai Shri Sivan Kovil 
 Sengeerai Meenachi Amman Koil
 Muni Kovil
 Maavadi Karuppar Aalayam
 Sonaiyakaruppar Kovil
 Uyyavanthamman kovil
 Velathudai Ayyanar Temple
 Senkidai Karuppar Koyil 
 Pattavan Kovil 
 Kalliyanaachi Amman Kovil
 Arulmigu Kaada Moorthi Ayyanar , Arulmigu Kulavaai Karuppar Aalayam 
 Ponni Kali Amman Kovil
 Ulagamkaathan Vinayagar Kovil
 Umaiyambigai Kovil
 Kaluththaruppan Kaali Kovil
 Ayingudi Ayyanaar Kovil

References 

Villages in Pudukkottai district